Robert I. Weisberg is an American lawyer. He is an Edwin E. Huddleson, Jr. Professor of Law at Stanford Law School, and an expert on criminal law and criminal procedure, as well as a leading scholar in the law and literature movement.

Weisberg was educated at Bronx High School of Science, and received his B.A. from City College of New York in 1966. He obtained his M.A. and Ph.D. degrees in English from Harvard University in 1967 and 1971. After graduation, he taught English at Skidmore College from 1970 to 1976. Weisberg left to attend Stanford Law School, where he received a J.D. in 1979 and was the Editor-in-Chief of the Stanford Law Review.  He then served as a law clerk for Judge J. Skelly Wright of the U.S. Court of Appeals for the District of Columbia Circuit, followed by Justice Potter Stewart of the U.S. Supreme Court during the 1980 Term.

In 1981, he joined the faculty at Stanford Law School, where he has won numerous teaching awards, served as special assistant to the provost for faculty recruitment and retention, and co-directs the Stanford Criminal Justice Center.  Weisberg's book, Literary Criticisms of Law, was published in 2000, and he is widely quoted in the press on criminal law and criminal procedure. He also co-authors a criminal law casebook.

See also 
 List of law clerks of the Supreme Court of the United States (Seat 8)

References

Selected publications

External links
 

1946 births
Living people
Lawyers from New York City
The Bronx High School of Science alumni
Harvard Graduate School of Arts and Sciences alumni
City College of New York alumni
Stanford Law School alumni
Law clerks of the Supreme Court of the United States
Skidmore College faculty
Stanford Law School faculty
Legal writers
American scholars of constitutional law
American legal scholars